Al Murqab may refer to:

Al Murqab, Kuwait, a town in the Al Kuwayt governorate
Al Murqab, Qatar, a settlement in the municipality of Ad Dawhah